Arantxa Sánchez Vicario was the defending champion, but lost in the third round to Helena Suková.

Monica Seles won the title, defeating Amanda Coetzer 6–0, 6–1 in the final. It was Seles' first tournament back after being stabbed during a match in April 1993.

Seeds
The top eight seeds receive a bye into the second round. 

 Steffi Graf (second round)
 Monica Seles (champion)
 Arantxa Sánchez Vicario (third round)
 Jana Novotná (semifinals)
 Mary Pierce (quarterfinals)
 Gabriela Sabatini (semifinals)
 Anke Huber (quarterfinals)
 Iva Majoli (quarterfinals)
 Mary Joe Fernández (withdrew due to endometriosis)
 Amy Frazier (third round)
 Brenda Schultz-McCarthy (withdrew)
 Nathalie Tauziat (third round)
 Helena Suková (quarterfinals)
 Martina Hingis (third round)
 Judith Wiesner (third round)
 Irina Spîrlea (third round)
 Sabine Appelmans (third round)
 Karina Habšudová (first round)

Draw

Finals

Top half

Section 1

Section 2

Bottom half

Section 3

Section 4

References

External links
Main Draw

1995 WTA Tour
1995 in Canadian tennis
1995 Canadian Open (tennis)